Carmelo Esteban "Steve" Martin Caro (October 12, 1948 – January 14, 2020), originally known as Steve Martin, was an American rock musician. He is best known as the original lead singer of the 1960s baroque pop band The Left Banke. The son of flamenco guitarist and vocalist Sarita Heredia, he added his family surname, Caro, in the 1980s to avoid confusion with the comedian of the same name.

Early years
Steve Martin Caro was born in Madrid, Spain, on October 12, 1948. His mother was Sarita Heredia, the only female flamenco guitarist in the world during the 1950s and 1960s. His father, Pedro Martin Caro, was a Representative from Spain to New York. Martin Caro attended school in Madrid before coming to the United States as a teenager. His father died six months after moving the family from Spain to New York City.

In 1965, Martin Caro (who was already working with George Cameron in Greenwich Village) happened to meet another future bandmate, Tom Finn, in front of the City Squire Hotel in New York after a Rolling Stones concert. Finn told Martin Caro about a mid-town recording studio which needed singers for session play. The studio was owned and operated by violinist Harry Lookofsky, father of Michael Brown (yet another founding member of the band), and the foundation was laid for the collaboration soon to be known as The Left Banke.

The Left Banke

With The Left Banke, Steve Martin (as he was known at the time) scored chart hits with "Walk Away Renée," "Pretty Ballerina" and "Desiree" in the 1966-68 period. In addition to providing most of the lead vocals on Left Banke recordings, he occasionally made instrumental contributions, playing guitar or bass and tambourine on various songs. He was credited (along with Michael Brown) for the tracks "Two by Two" and "Love Songs in the Night," written and recorded with Left Banke members. They appear on the Buddah Records soundtrack for the 1972 adult film Hot Parts.

In January 2018, it was announced on the official Facebook page compiled by Martin Caro and George Cameron that they were planning a tour. Several photos of Martin Caro rehearsing with George Cameron and guitarist Sam Kogon were posted with a message which stated "it was Steve's first time behind the microphone in over 15 years. We went through and workshopped much of the Left Banke catalog."  However, no public appearances occurred before George Cameron died five months later.

Death
Martin Caro died from heart disease on January 14, 2020. He was 71.

References

External links
LeftBanke.nu Left Banke Fansite with videos, pictures, discography, Leftbankeisms, and more
The Left Banke Fan Page
The Left Banke Smash Sessions, Montage, Christopher & The Chaps

1948 births
2020 deaths
American male singers
American rock singers